is a passenger railway station located in Izumi-ku, Yokohama, Japan, operated by the private railway operator Sagami Railway (Sotetsu).

Lines 
Yumegaoka Station is served by the Sagami Railway Izumino Line, and lies 9.3 kilometers from the starting point of the line at Futamatagawa Station.

Station layout
The station consists of a single island platform serving two tracks. The station is elevated and is built on top of a road using a Nielsen Lohse Bridge design.

Platforms

Adjacent stations

History 
Yumegaoka Station was opened on March 10, 1999.

Passenger statistics
In fiscal 2019, the station was used by an average of 2,208 passengers daily.

The passenger figures for previous years are as shown below.

Surrounding area
 Yumegaoka housing district

See also
 List of railway stations in Japan

References

External links 

 Official home page  

Railway stations in Kanagawa Prefecture
Railway stations in Japan opened in 1999
Railway stations in Yokohama